Wonder Cave may refer to:

Wonder Cave (Kromdraai, Gauteng)
Wonder Cave (Rudolph, Wisconsin)
Wonder Cave (San Marcos, Texas)